Werauhia vittata is a plant species in the genus Werauhia. This species is native to Costa Rica and Ecuador.

References

vittata
Flora of Costa Rica
Flora of Ecuador